Veselin Nanev (born 21 January 1987) is a Bulgarian windsurfer. He competed in the men's Mistral One Design event at the 2004 Summer Olympics.

References

External links
 

1987 births
Living people
Bulgarian male sailors (sport)
Bulgarian windsurfers
Olympic sailors of Bulgaria
Sailors at the 2004 Summer Olympics – Mistral One Design
People from Pomorie